The 2018–19 Mid-American Conference women's basketball season began with practices in October 2018, followed by the start of the 2018–19 NCAA Division I women's basketball season in November. Conference play began in January 2019 and concluded in March 2019. Central Michigan won its third straight regular season title with a record of 15–3 by one game over Ohio. Cierra Dillard of Buffalo was named MAC player of the year.

Fourth-seeded Buffalo won the MAC tournament by beating Central Michigan in the semi-finals and Ohio in the final. Central Michigan was given an at large bid as an eight-seed in the Chicago Region of the NCAA tournament where they lost to Michigan State 89–88. Buffalo was the ten-seed in the Albany Region where they defeated Rutgers before losing to the eventual winner of the region Connecticut 84–72 Ohio, Kent State, Miami, and Toledo all qualified for the WNIT.  Ohio won three games before losing to Northwestern and reached 30 total wins on the season.

Preseason awards
The preseason coaches' poll and league awards were announced by the league office on October 31, 2018.

Preseason women's basketball coaches poll
(First place votes in parenthesis)

East Division
 Buffalo (4) 62
 Miami (5) 61
 Ohio (3) 57 
 Kent State 28 
 Bowling Green 27 
 Akron 17

West Division
 Central Michigan (12) 72
 Toledo 52
 Eastern Michigan 41
 Northern Illinois 38
 Ball State 34
 Western Michigan 15

Regular Season Champion
Central Michigan (9), Miami (2), Ohio (1)

Tournament champs
Central Michigan (8), Buffalo (3), Northern Illinois (1)

Honors

Postseason

Mid–American tournament

NCAA tournament

Women's National Invitational Tournament

Postseason awards

Coach of the Year: Sue Guevara, Central Michigan
Player of the Year: Reyna Frost, Central Michigan 
Freshman of the Year: Erica Johnson, Ohio
Defensive Player of the Year: Cece Hooks, Ohio
Sixth Man of the Year: Erica Johnson, Ohio

Honors

See also
2018–19 Mid-American Conference men's basketball season

References